Cyanopepla masia is a moth of the subfamily Arctiinae. It was described by Paul Dognin in 1889. It is found in Ecuador.

References

Cyanopepla
Moths described in 1889